Onebala obsoleta is a moth in the family Gelechiidae. It was described by Anthonie Johannes Theodorus Janse in 1954. It is found in Mozambique, Namibia and South Africa.

References

Moths described in 1954
Onebala